Count Aleksander August Zamoyski (1770 - 6 December 1800) was a Polish nobleman (szlachcic).

Aleksander became the 11th Ordynat of Zamość estate. He died childless.

References

1770 births
1800 deaths
Counts of Poland
Aleksander August